The 11th Army was a World War II field army.

History

The 11th Army was established on 5 October 1940 as "Kommandostab Leipzig", but changed its designation to Kommandostab München on 23 April 1941. It was restructured into Heeresgruppe Don on 21 November 1942. After being reformed on 26 January 1945 and taking part in various counter-offensives against the Soviet and US advance, the army surrendered to American troops on 23 April 1945.

Formation
The 11th Army was activated in 1940 to prepare for the forthcoming German attack on the Soviet Union.

The 11th Army was part of Army Group South when it invaded the USSR during Operation Barbarossa. In September 1941, Erich von Manstein was appointed its commander. His predecessor, Colonel-General Eugen Ritter von Schobert, perished when his Fieseler Storch aircraft landed in a Soviet minefield.

At the start of Barbarossa, the 11th Army order of battle included:
 

LIV Corps
 50th Infantry division
 170th Infantry division
 138th Artillery brigade
 190th Assault Gun battalion
 197th Assault Gun battalion
 46th Combat Engineer battalion
 744th Combat Engineer battalion
 454th Corps Signal battalion

XXX Corps
 198th Infantry division
 14th Infantry division (Romanian)
 5th Cavalry brigade (Romanian)
 110th Artillery brigade
 249th Assault Gun battalion
 610th Anti-aircraft Artillery battalion
 70th Nebelwerfer battalion (150 mm mortars 280 mm guns)
 690th Field Engineer regiment
 430th Corps Signal battalion
 430th Corps Supply battalion
 430th Corps Cartographic battalion

 XI Corps
 76th Infantry division
 239th Infantry division

 Army reserves and other assets
 22nd Infantry division
 766th Artillery regiment
 300th Tank battalion
 19th Construction brigade
 926th Construction command
 617th Cartography battalion
 558th Army Communications regiment
 756th Traffic controllers battalion
 Railroad operations command
 693rd Propaganda company

The 11th Army was tasked with invading the Crimea and the pursuit of enemy forces on the flank of Army Group South during its advance into the Soviet Union.

The 11th Army order of battle included three Corps: XXX Corps, which was composed of the 22nd, 72nd and Leibstandarte Adolf Hitler divisions and the XI Corps, consisting of the 170th Infantry Division and the 1st and 4th Mountain Divisions; and LIVth Corps, consisting of the 46th, 73rd and 50th Infantry Divisions. The latter formation had been in charge of the advance into the Crimean peninsula earlier in September. The Romanian 3rd Army, three Mountain brigades and three cavalry brigades, were also under von Manstein's command.

Einsatzgruppe D was attached to the 11th Army.

Battle of Sevastopol

The 11th Army fought in southern USSR from 1941 until mid-summer 1942 and laid siege to Sevastopol. It did not take part in Fall Blau when Army Group South attacked in Southern Russia towards the Caucasus and Stalingrad. The 11th Army cut the Soviets off from the sea at Sevastopol, thus sealing the fate of the remaining defenders. After a 248-day-long siege, an estimated 100,000 prisoners marched into captivity. For his achievements in this battle, Manstein was promoted to field marshal. A grateful Adolf Hitler also authorized the Crimean Shield to commemorate the efforts of the 11th Army. It was a costly victory, however:  the 11th Army's casualties and material losses were so high it was no longer a viable fighting force in its own right. Manstein recommended that the 11th Army either cross the straits of Kerch and push into the Kuban area to aid in the capture of Rostov, or be placed into Army Group South reserve. Instead, part of the 11th Army, along with the heavy siege train, was transferred to Army Group North. Ordered to oversee Leningrad's reduction, Manstein transferred with them. The remainder of the 11th Army was parcelled out to Army Group Center and Army Group South.

This breakup of the 11th Army and its disappearance from the order of battle of Army Group South would have dire consequences for Nazi Germany. During the course of the following fall and winter of 1942, the Battle of Stalingrad took place. The Luftwaffe had largely reduced the city to rubble and the presence of the Volga behind the city made it virtually impossible for the Germans to follow the classical dual pincer envelopment strategy. The Red Army now opted 'hugging' tactics, (keeping the front lines as close to the Axis forces as possible), thereby rendering tanks, aircraft, and artillery largely redundant, and placing the entire responsibility on the infantry.

Although the 6th Army had managed to capture most of the city and had pushed the Soviets to the banks of the Volga river in several places, it needed several more infantry divisions (as explained above), to take the city completely. In spite of repeated requests to the German high command, the 6th Army was not reinforced because no other reinforcements were available in the region, or close enough to support them. As the battle grew more intense, the Soviets counterattacked on both sides of the 6th Army's flanks and destroyed the Romanian 3rd and 4th Armies. The Soviet pincers then linked up, thereby surrounding and ultimately destroying the 6th Army.

The 11th Army was de-activated on 21 November 1942 and was used to form the newly created Army Group Don.

Order of Battle During the Battle for Sevastopol
The 11th Army, during the battle of Sevastopol, consisted of nine German infantry divisions (including two taken on strength during the battle), in two corps, and two Romanian rifle corps, plus various supporting elements, including 150 tanks, several hundred aircraft and one of the heaviest concentrations of artillery fielded by the Wehrmacht.

LIV Corps
22nd Infantry Division - commanded by General der Infanterie Ludwig Wolff
24th Infantry Division
50th Infantry Division
132nd Infantry Division
XXX Corps - commanded by General der Infanterie Hans von Salmuth
28th Light Division
72nd Infantry Division
170th Infantry Division
Romanian Mountain Corps - commanded by Major General Gheorghe Avramescu
1st Mountain Division
4th Mountain Division
18th Infantry Division

October 1944 to April 1945

The 11th SS Panzer Army (SS panzer-Armeeoberkommando 11. ), was not much more than a paper formation formed between November 1944 and February 1945 by Reichsführer-SS Heinrich Himmler while he was commander of Army Group Vistula.The historian Antony Beevor wrote that, when the 11th SS Panzer Army was created, the available units could constitute a corps at best, "'But panzer army' observed Eismann 'has a better ring to it'". It also allowed Himmler to promote SS officers to senior staff and field commands within the formation. Obergruppenführer Felix Steiner, probably the best SS officer available, was named its commander. The formation was officially listed as the 11th Army but it was also known as SS Panzer-Armeeoberkommando 11. and is often referred to in English as the 11th SS Panzer Army.

After fighting east of the Oder River during February 1945, the 11th was assigned to OB West, reorganized, and given command of new units, for combat against the Western Allies in March 1945. After fighting in the vicinity of the Weser River and the Harz mountains, the 11th surrendered on April 21.

Commanders

See also
11th Army (German Empire) for the equivalent formation in World War I

Footnotes

References
Beevor, Antony. Berlin: The Downfall 1945, Penguin Books, 2002, .
Tessin, Georg Verbände und Truppen der deutschen Wehrmacht und Waffen-SS 1939 - 1945, Volume 3, Biblio Verlag, 1974, .

11
Military units and formations established in 1940
Military units and formations disestablished in 1942
Military units and formations established in 1944
Military units and formations disestablished in 1945